Daniel J. Lynch (1916–1981) was the former athletic director and basketball coach at St. Francis College. Lynch was also a noted public speaker, regularly addressing civic and sports groups. Lynch was often referred to as, The Smiling Irishman.

Biography
Daniel Lynch graduated from St. Francis College in 1938. He played on the College's basketball team from 1934–1938 and was the team's Captain. Lynch then went on to become the basketball head coach at his Alma Mater from 1948–1969. In 1964 he was appointed as the Athletic Director of St. Francis College, a post he held for eleven years, until 1975. One of Lynch's sons, Daniel Lynch Jr., also attended St. Francis College and is a graduate of the 1970 class.

Lynch was one of the original proponents of the Three-point field goal.

St. Francis College
Lynch holds the St. Francis College record for most wins by a coach. During his tenure the Terriers men's basketball program experienced their best seasons. The greatest of which, was the 1955–56 season. The Terriers compiled a 21–4 record, were ranked as high as 13th nationally and upset Niagara University to reach the NIT semi-finals before they were defeated.

From 1948 to 1952 the Terriers participated in 4 National Catholic Invitational Tournaments (NCIT). The NCIT was a premier post-season tournament at that time. The Terriers went to the NCIT finals three consecutive times and won the Championship in 1951. Lynch's 1950–51 squad defeated the Seattle University Redhawks 93–79 in the Championship game. 

From 1953 to 1969, Lynch guided the Terriers to 3 NIT appearances and 3 Conference Regular Season Championships. Lynch coached many great players like Al Innis and Jim Luisi and during his tenure had 7 players drafted by the NBA.

Lynch was also a large supporter of the Terriers having their own basketball court. Prior to building the Generoso Pope Athletic Complex in 1971, the Terriers for 21 seasons did not have a home court of their own. They played at the 14th Regiment Armory, the 69th Regiment Armory, and at times the Bishop Ford High School gymnasium.

Head coaching record

References

  

St. Francis Brooklyn Terriers men's basketball coaches
St. Francis Brooklyn Terriers men's basketball players
St. Francis Brooklyn Terriers athletic directors
1916 births
1981 deaths